Reassurance policing is a model of policing that centers on signal crimes. Developed in the United Kingdom, reassurance policing aims to identify "signals", and involve the community in solving community-related problems (similar to the community policing model).

See also
Signal crime

References

Law enforcement
Criminology
Types of policing